WLTS may refer to:

 WLTS (FM), a defunct radio station (90.7 FM) formerly licensed to serve Barrettsville, Georgia, United States
 WLTS (FM), a defunct radio station (105.3 FM) formerly licensed to serve New Orleans, Louisiana, United States
 WBUS (FM), a radio station (99.5 FM) licensed to serve Centre Hall, Pennsylvania, United States, which held the call sign WLTS from 2006 to 2007